Lasse Taisto Äikäs (26 January 1932, Kuolemajärvi – 12 June 1988) was a Finnish lawyer, civil servant and politician. He served as Minister of Defence from 26 May 1979 to 18 February 1982. He was a member of the Parliament of Finland from 1975 to 1983, representing the Centre Party.

References

1932 births
1988 deaths
People from Vyborg District
Centre Party (Finland) politicians
Ministers of Defence of Finland
Members of the Parliament of Finland (1975–79)
Members of the Parliament of Finland (1979–83)